Gol Zard-e Malmir (also Romanized as Gol Zard-e Mālmīr and Gol-e Zard-e Mālmīr; also known as Gol-e Zard, Gol Zard, and Gul-i-Zard) is a village in Hendudur Rural District, Sarband District, Shazand County, Markazi Province, Iran. At the 2006 census, its population was 110, in 39 families.

References 

Populated places in Shazand County